Coenitidae is an extinct family of prehistoric corals in the order Favositida.

References

External links 
 

Prehistoric cnidarian families
Tabulata
Silurian first appearances
Mississippian extinctions